"If I Had Any Pride Left at All" is a song written by John Greenebaum, Troy Seals and Eddie Setser, and recorded by American country music artist John Berry. It was released in October 1995 as the third single from the album Standing on the Edge.  The song reached number 25 on the U.S. Billboard Hot Country Singles & Tracks chart but peaked at number 11 on the Canadian RPM Country Tracks chart.

Cover versions
 Joe Diffie originally recorded the song on his 1993 album Honky Tonk Attitude.
 Etta James recorded her own cover of this song for her 1997 album Love's Been Rough on Me.

Critical reception
Larry Flick, of Billboard magazine reviewed the song favorably, saying that Berry puts his "impressive set of pipes to use on this heart wrenching ballad."

Music video
The music video was directed by Deaton Flanigen and premiered in late 1995.

Chart performance
"If I Had Any Pride Left at All" debuted at number 71 on the U.S. Billboard Hot Country Singles & Tracks for the week of October 21, 1995.

Year-end charts

References

1995 singles
1993 songs
Joe Diffie songs
John Berry (country singer) songs
Etta James songs
Songs written by Troy Seals
Song recordings produced by Jimmy Bowen
Liberty Records singles
Music videos directed by Deaton-Flanigen Productions
Songs written by Eddie Setser
Songs written by John Greenebaum